"A Rockin' Good Way (to Mess Around and Fall in Love)" is a song first recorded in 1958 by Priscilla Bowman, on the Abner Records label (ABNER DJ 1018). Bowman was given vocal backing by The Spaniels.

Dinah Washington and Brook Benton
In 1960, the song was recorded as a pop and R&B duet by Dinah Washington and Brook Benton.  The single was the second pairing for the singers and, like their first single together, it went to number 1 on the R&B chart and was a top ten pop single as well.

The song was written by Benton, Clyde Otis and Luchi de Jesus. The single, with the song title styled "A ROCKIN' GOOD WAY (To Mess Around And Fall I Love)", included orchestra arranged and conducted by Belford Hendricks.

Charts

Weekly charts

Year-end charts

Shakin' Stevens and Bonnie Tyler

A duet by the UK's Shakin' Stevens and Bonnie Tyler was released on 30 December 1983 and made number 5 in the UK singles chart and number 1 in Ireland. It was included on Stevens' 1984 album The Bop Won't Stop. The B-side was a live recording by Stevens' of "Why Do You Treat Me This Way?" at the Birmingham Odeon.

Charts

Weekly charts

Year-end charts

References

External links 
 

1958 songs
1958 singles
1960 singles
Songs written by Clyde Otis
Songs written by Brook Benton
Dinah Washington songs
Brook Benton songs
Shakin' Stevens songs
Bonnie Tyler songs
Mercury Records singles
Vocal collaborations